Gena (Amharic: ገና) or qarsa (ቃርሳ) is a traditional field hockey game popular in the Ethiopian highlands. It is a game played in the space between villages but with no defined boundaries. It is played among two teams who attempt to throw a wooden ball in the air and hit it with sticks, the goal being to prevent the opposing team to bring the ball to their village. The game is closely associated with Gena the January 7 celebration of Christmas, from which it gets its name.

References 

Field hockey in Ethiopia
Variations of field hockey
Team sports
Ball games